Triodoclytus lanifer is a species of beetle in the family Cerambycidae, the only species in the genus Triodoclytus.

References

Clytini